Eudoxia Muller Woodward (June 14, 1919 – January 20, 2008) was an American artist and chemistry researcher. She was known for her work with Edwin H. Land at the Polaroid Corporation, where her research helped produce the Vectograph and the earliest forms of Polaroid instant photography.

Education and personal life
Born Eudoxia M. Muller in Flushing, New York to Olga Popoff Muller, a sculptor, and John Muller an architect, she grew up in New York City. She attended St. Agatha’s School for high school and went on to receive her bachelor's degree from Smith College. She then settled in Boston, Massachusetts.

While at Polaroid, she met Robert Burns Woodward, who had been hired as a consultant. They married in September 1946 and had two children.

Work at Polaroid 
As a researcher at Polaroid, Woodward worked on Vectographs and research dedicated to instant photography. In 1944, Woodward worked on a special project (SX-70) led by Edwin Land that was dedicated to instant photography and the creation of an instant film camera. Woodward was the first person to ever see a Polaroid instant picture developed as part of her work with the SX-70 project.

Post-Polaroid career
After leaving Polaroid, she taught art at the Belmont Day School in Belmont, Massachusetts and at retirement communities.

The title of Woodward's 1977 art show in Boston, "Flowers - Art or Science?", exemplified the contradictions in her work. Her watercolor Pentagonal Red Hibiscus, displayed at a show in 1995 at the Francesca Anderson Fine Art gallery in Lexington, exemplified the unity she found in the two approaches to experience. For the Pentagonal Red Hibiscus she said she had plotted four views of the blossom against a pentagon. Her works have been shown in exhibitions at, among other sites, the DeCordova Museum and her alma mater, Smith College.

Variously, Woodward served on the boards of the Boston Museum of Science, the Boston Museum of Fine Arts, and the Cambridge Art Association. In 2002, the New England Watercolor Society awarded Woodward the "Stanhope Framers Prize".

In 2008, she died of cancer at her home in Belmont, Massachusetts.

References

Further reading
Woodward, Crystal. The Geometry of Flowers: Eudoxia Woodward. Self-published, 2012.

1919 births
2008 deaths
American women painters
People from Queens, New York
Artists from Boston
People from Belmont, Massachusetts
Smith College alumni
Deaths from cancer in Massachusetts
Painters from New York City
American women chemists
20th-century American painters
20th-century American women artists
20th-century American women scientists
21st-century American women